Vlokia ater was the first species described for the genus Vlokia in the Aizoaceae plant family. The genus name (generic epithet) honors the discoverer, South African botanist, Jan H. J. Vlok (1957-). The species name (specific epithet) derives from the Latin adjective "ater" for "black" and refers to the black coloring which older leaf leaves assume.

Description 
The first description of the genus and species was published in 1994 by Steven A. Hammer (S.A.Hammer) (1951-).

Vlokia ater is a perennial succulent plant. It has short stems, which usually bear a single leaf pair. Its growth habit is compact to spreading.

The leaves are small, dotted, grayish-green to brownish-green and remain on the plants for several years turning dull black. The leaves are fused together and enclose the stem.

The solitary flower is carried in a bract which sits on a short pedicel. There are six sepals. Numerous (up to 80), pink or white staminodes surround the approximately 16 stamens. The nectaries form a dark green ring.

Vlokia ater blooms in early spring (August–September in habitat). The short-lived flowers open at noon and close at dusk.

The fruits are usually six- (rarely five- or seven-) fold and often blacken with increasing age. The seeds are very dark brown, pear-shaped and very hard.

Systematics and distribution 
The distribution range of Vlokia ater is a small area at Montagu in the western Little Karoo of Western Cape, South Africa.

The Red List of South African Plants at the South African National Biodiversity Institute describes Vlokia ater as 'critically rare'.

References

Bibliography 
 Heidrun E.K. Hartmann, Illustrated Handbook of Succulent Plants: Aizoaceae F-Z, Springer Verlag, Berlin / Heidelberg / New York 2001, p. 350, 
 Gideon Smith et al., Mesembs of the World: Illustrated Guide to a Remarkable Succulent Group, Briza Publications 1998, pp. 130–131.

External links 
 SucculentGuide.com Genus: Vlokia

Aizoaceae
Flora of the Cape Provinces